Richard L. Breen (June 26, 1918 – February 1, 1967) was a Hollywood screenwriter and director.

Biography
Breen was born in Chicago of Irish Catholic extraction. He began as a freelance radio writer. After a stint in the U.S. Navy during World War II, he began writing for films. He won an Oscar for his work on the screenplay to Titanic (1953), and was nominated for A Foreign Affair (1948) and Captain Newman, M.D. (1963). In 1957, he directed one film Stopover Tokyo, and then returned to screenwriting. He was president of the Screenwriters' Guild from 1952 to 1953.

Filmography
A Foreign Affair (1948)
Isn't It Romantic? (1948)
Miss Tatlock's Millions (1948)
Top o' the Morning (1949)
Appointment with Danger (1950)
Fancy Pants (1950) – uncredited
The Mating Season (1951)
The Model and the Marriage Broker (1951)
O. Henry's Full House (1952)
Niagara (1953)
Titanic (1953)
Dragnet (1954)
The Colgate Comedy Hour (1954) – contributor to one episode
Pete Kelly's Blues (1955)
Seven Cities of Gold (1955)
24 Hour Alert (1955) (short)
The 28th Annual Academy Awards (1956)
Stopover Tokyo (1957) – also director
The FBI Story (1959)
Wake Me When It's Over (1960)
State Fair (1962)
PT 109 (1963)
Mary, Mary (1963)
Captain Newman, M.D. (1963)
Do Not Disturb (1965)
A Man Could Get Killed (1966)
Insight – various episodes
Tony Rome (1967)
Dragnet 1966 (1967)
Dragnet 1967 (1967) – episode "The Christmas Story"

References

1918 births
1967 deaths
Writers from Chicago
American male screenwriters
Film directors from Illinois
Best Original Screenplay Academy Award winners
American people of Irish descent
Catholics from Illinois
Screenwriters from Illinois
20th-century American male writers
20th-century American screenwriters
United States Navy personnel of World War II